In My Wildest Dreams is the debut studio album by American country music artist Kenny Chesney. It was released on April 19, 1994 as the only album for the Capricorn Records label. The title track was previously recorded by Aaron Tippin on his 1991 debut album You've Got to Stand for Something, while "I Want My Rib Back" was originally recorded by Keith Whitley on his album Kentucky Bluebird.

This album produced two chart singles for Chesney in 1994 on the Billboard country charts: "Whatever It Takes" at number 59 and "The Tin Man" at number 70. The latter song would also be included on his next album, All I Need to Know. Chesney also re-recorded "The Tin Man" in 2000 for his first Greatest Hits album, and released the new rendition as a single that year.

Track listing

Personnel
 Eddie Bayers – drums
 Kenny Chesney – acoustic guitar, lead vocals
 Glen Duncan – fiddle
 Paul Franklin – steel guitar
 Rob Hajacos – fiddle
 High and Dry Party Choir – background vocals and clapping on "High and Dry"
 Steve Nathan – keyboards
 Tammy Pierce – background vocals
 Don Potter – acoustic guitar, electric guitar
 Michael Rhodes – bass guitar
 Hargus "Pig" Robbins – keyboards
 Brent Rowan – electric guitar
 Harry Stinson – background vocals
 Dennis Wilson – background vocals
 Curtis Young – background vocals

Chart performance

Album

Singles

References

1994 debut albums
Kenny Chesney albums
Capricorn Records albums
Albums produced by Barry Beckett